Junior hockey is a level of competitive ice hockey generally for players between 16 and 21 years of age. Junior hockey leagues in the United States and Canada are considered amateur (with some exceptions) and operate within regions of each country.

In Canada, the highest level is major junior, and is governed by the Canadian Hockey League, which itself has three constituent leagues: the Ontario Hockey League, Quebec Major Junior Hockey League, and the Western Hockey League. The second tier is Junior A, governed nationally by the Canadian Junior Hockey League and is composed of several regional leagues.

In the United States, the top level is Tier I, represented by the United States Hockey League. Tier II is represented by the North American Hockey League. There are several Tier III and independently sanctioned leagues throughout the country. A limited number of teams in the Canadian major junior leagues are also based in the United States.

In Europe, junior teams are often sponsored by professional teams, and act as development and feeder associations for those organizations.

In Canada, junior hockey is one level above minor ice hockey, the level of ice hockey played by younger players. Minor hockey is often called "youth hockey" in the United States to avoid confusion with professional minor league ice hockey.

Canada
Junior hockey in Canada is broken into several tiers, and players aged 16–20 at the beginning of the season are eligible. Hockey Canada has enacted rules designed to limit the number of 16-year-olds allowed to play junior hockey, preferring most remain at the minor level.

Major junior
Major junior hockey is overseen by the Canadian Hockey League (CHL), which acts as the governing body for its three constituent leagues:
Quebec Major Junior Hockey League – operating in Quebec and Atlantic Canada  with 18 teams
Ontario Hockey League – operating in Ontario, Pennsylvania, and Michigan with 20 teams
Western Hockey League – operating in Western Canada, Washington, and Oregon with 22 teams

The CHL currently places a cap of three 20-year-old-or-over players per team, commonly known as "overage players". The CHL also allows up to four 16-year-olds on each roster. While fifteen-year-old players were formerly permitted to play a limited number of games per season at the CHL level, they are now permitted to play only if they are deemed exceptional by Hockey Canada. , seven players have qualified under this rule: centre John Tavares in 2005, defenceman Aaron Ekblad in 2011, centre Connor McDavid in 2012, defenceman Sean Day in 2013, centre Joe Veleno in 2015, centre Shane Wright in 2019, and forward Connor Bedard in 2020. CHL teams are currently permitted two "imports" (players from outside Canada or the US, generally from Europe or Russia) each.

Due to paying players stipends and allowing junior players that have signed entry-level contracts with the NHL, all CHL teams are considered professional by the NCAA; thus any player who plays a game at the Major Junior level loses his eligibility to play for universities in the United States. The player retains eligibility for Canadian universities however, and all three leagues have programs in place to grant scholarships for any player who plays in these leagues provided he does not turn professional once their junior career ends. Many of the National Hockey League’s (NHL) top prospects play in the CHL.

The champion of each league competes in an annual tournament with a predetermined host team for the Memorial Cup, Canada's national major junior championship.

Up until 1970, the leagues that were classified as Major Junior and "Junior A" today were both part of Junior A. In 1970 they were divided into "Tier I Junior A" or "Major Junior A" and "Tier II Junior A". In 1980, the three Major Junior A leagues opted for self-control over being controlled by the branches of the Canadian Amateur Hockey Association and became Major Junior hockey, Tier II Junior A became the top tier of hockey in the CAHA and became Junior A hockey.

Junior A
Junior A (junior AAA in Quebec) hockey is one level below the CHL. Junior A was referred to as Tier II Junior A in the 1970s, until what was called Major Junior A broke away from their regional branches in 1980 and formed the Canadian Hockey League, becoming Major Junior hockey. At that time, the term Tier II was dropped from what is now Junior A hockey. It is governed by the Canadian Junior Hockey League (CJHL), which oversees nine constituent leagues across Canada as of 2021. The national championship is the Centennial Cup.

As of 2021, there is one Hockey Canada sanctioned Junior A league that is not a member of the CJHL: the British Columbia Hockey League.

Junior A teams are considered amateur by the NCAA, thus players intending to go to American universities tend to choose this route rather than play in the CHL. Junior A teams tend to play in much smaller markets than CHL teams, and thus play to smaller crowds.

Junior B, C, D
Junior B (junior AA in Quebec) was created in 1933, to differentiate between teams eligible for Memorial Cup competition and those who were not. The major championships across Canada are the Sutherland Cup in Southern Ontario, the Barkley Cup in the Ottawa District, the Coupe Dodge in Quebec, the Don Johnson Cup in the Atlantic Provinces, and the Keystone Cup which represents all of Western Canada, from British Columbia to Northwestern Ontario.

Junior C (junior A in Quebec) generally consists of local competitions, but is considered competitive in some regions, and serve as seeding or farm-teams for Junior B teams. Ontario Junior C Hockey has six rounds of best-of-seven playoffs (up to 42 games per team) for the Clarence Schmalz Cup which was first awarded in 1938. The Ontario Junior C playoffs are played for between six of the Province's seven different regional leagues. In Quebec and West of Manitoba, Junior C hockey tends to be an extension of the local minor hockey system and is sometimes called Juvenile or House League. In Ontario, Manitoba, and the Maritimes, Junior C is run independently of minor hockey systems, though with the same mostly recreational purpose.

Junior D was popular in the 1960s and 1970s in dense population centers, but fell off in the early 1990s. In Quebec, Junior D is now known as Junior B and is run strictly by minor hockey associations. The last Junior D league was the OHA's Southern Ontario Junior Hockey League, the result of the merger of the Northern, Western, and Southern Junior D leagues in the late 1980s. The SOJHL moved to Junior C league in 2012.

United States
As in Canada, junior hockey in the United States is subdivided into several levels with most being sanctioned by USA Hockey. Currently, 13 American teams play in the Canadian junior system, with eight in the Canadian Hockey League and five in junior A leagues. The CHL includes four teams in Washington and one in Oregon in the Western Hockey League, and two teams in Michigan and one in Pennsylvania in the Ontario Hockey League. At junior A level, one team (formally two) in the Superior International Junior Hockey League is located in Spooner, Wisconsin, one team in the British Columbia Hockey League is from Washington, one in the Northern Ontario Junior Hockey League is from Michigan, and one in the Ontario Junior Hockey League is from New York.

Tier I
The United States Hockey League (USHL) is currently the only Tier I league in the country, consisting of teams in the central and midwestern United States. The USHL provides an alternative to the Canadian Hockey League, which pays its major junior hockey players a stipend, for players who wish to maintain NCAA eligibility for later in their career.

While playing in the USHL, all player expenses are paid for by the team; no membership or equipment fees are charged. Unlike major junior teams, free-college stipend does not exist. Historically, professional leagues have drafted less directly from USHL teams, although this trend has shifted in recent years, coinciding with the USNTDP moving to the USHL in 2009-10. In the 2019 NHL Entry Draft, 17 of the 44 players drafted out of the USHL played for the USNTDP. Those 44 draft picks were 16 more than any of the three leagues in the Canadian Hockey League, and included 9 first round picks (8 of which came from the USNTDP) and 7 second round picks.

For most of its existence the USHL was considered inferior in quality of play to the major junior levels. But it continued to improve and as of 2019 about 21 percent of NHL players had played USHL in their career. Between 80 and 90 percent of USHL players continued into NCAA hockey, with 33 percent advancing to the NHL as of 2019.

Tier II
Currently, the North American Hockey League is the only USA Hockey-sanctioned Tier II league in the United States. The NAHL consists of teams spread across the western two thirds of the United States with a significant concentration of teams in the central and southwestern parts of the United States, although the league began to expand to east coast as of 2015. In October 2016, the Tier III United States Premier Hockey League, a league predominately located on the east coast, applied to USA Hockey for approval of a Tier II league to begin in the 2017–18 season, however, the league was denied that December and decided to operate its Tier II league independently.

The NAHL, like the USHL, provides young players an alternative to major junior hockey, although the skill level is considered significantly lower than major junior hockey and typically filled with those who would not or did not make the roster of a Tier I team. Unlike Tier I, the NAHL does not pay for all players' expenses, such as room and board, but there is no tuition cost to the player as in Tier III.

Tier III 
In addition to paying for room and board, players at the Tier III level pay a fee or tuition, commonly ranging from $4,000 to $9,500. This is for all accounts and purposes an amateur level, although some players go directly to NCAA Division I schools. Most Tier III players are looking to increase their skills in hopes to move up to Tier I or II, while other players go directly to NCAA Division III, ACHA and CHF schools.

Prior to July 2011, USA Hockey split Tier III into Junior A and B divisions.

USA Hockey currently has one sanctioned Tier III league:
 North American 3 Hockey League

Non-USA Hockey Tier III Leagues:
 Eastern Hockey League – two divisions (EHL and EHL Premier)
 United States Premier Hockey League | two divisions (Premier and Elite)

Independent leagues (Canada and US) 
Some leagues that refer to themselves as Junior A also operate outside the control of the Hockey Canada and USA Hockey, typically due to restrictions from the governing bodies over player recruitment and finances. While a league can claim to be comparable to Junior A leagues, due to the lack of regulation the actual level of play may vary. In addition to independent leagues, there are also independent teams, such as the Jamestown Jets, although these usually result from league problems or other disputes. These leagues are often referred to as "outlaw" leagues due to their lack of sanctioning or oversight from an outside governing body.

AAU 
The Amateur Athletic Union returned to sanctioning the sport of ice hockey in 2011. Prior to the 2011–12 season, the Western States Hockey League became the first large-scale junior league to exit USA Hockey in favor of the AAU. In 2012, the AAU formed the United Hockey Union for managing its hockey leagues and held a championship tournament in 2013 and 2014. Currently all junior hockey leagues under the UHU umbrella operate under a similar pay-to-play USA Hockey Tier III and Hockey Canada's Junior A structure, although the WSHL is considered Tier II within the UHU hierarchy. The UHU announced that starting in 2017 it would launch a free-to-play Tier I league called the Central One Hockey League; however, plans for the league were later called off and the people behind the C1HL launched the non-sanctioned USA Central Hockey League in 2018.

One of the main reasons that some teams and leagues have chosen the AAU is for the looser player import restrictions. In most USA Hockey sanctioned leagues, each team is limited to a maximum of four non-US citizen players (with a loophole for non-US citizens that have been registered USA Hockey members for three seasons). However, under AAU sanctioning, teams may have up to 14 non-North American players (meaning players from Canada and the United States are not counted as imports in either country). The increased import limit has led to more competitive teams where it was more difficult to recruit local talent. It also allows more European players opportunities to play in the junior level of North American hockey leagues that would be normally be limited under Hockey Canada and USA Hockey restrictions.

UHU junior leagues 
 Canadian Premier Junior Hockey League
 Western States Hockey League – Tier II status

Self-sanctioned leagues
Other leagues have their own guidelines for team and player restrictions with no outside oversight by a governing body.

Since 2006, the Greater Metro Junior A Hockey League has operated as an independent league in Ontario, Quebec, and Alberta. The league widely recruits players from outside of North America.

In late 2016, the United States Premier Hockey League, an organization composed of several USA Hockey Tier III junior as well as many youth hockey leagues, applied for a Tier II league. The Tier II status was denied in December 2016 but the USPHL moved forward with the new league anyway, creating the National Collegiate Development Conference. In response, the USPHL has removed all their junior level leagues (the NCDC and the Tier III-level Premier and Elite Divisions) from USA Hockey sanctioning since the 2017–18 season.

Europe

In Europe, junior teams are usually associated with a professional team, and are used by professional teams to develop their own prospects. One example of this is the J20 SuperElit league in Sweden or the Minor Hockey League in Russia. Such leagues are sometimes dubbed major junior hockey leagues.

The lack of an amateur draft in Europe means that the onus is on the teams to sign the most talented young players they can get, and the presence of an affiliated junior team provides a place for young players who are not yet ready for the rigours of the professional game to develop. However, not all players on a European junior team are necessarily property of their professional club, and may elect to sign elsewhere.

At the World Hockey Summit in 2010, nations in Europe expressed concern about the number of junior players leaving to play in North America, despite the improved talent level and the increasing popularity of the IIHF Ice Hockey World Junior Championships. Slavomir Lener, a director with the Czech Ice Hockey Association, felt that junior-aged players were enticed to play in North America before maturation, with a negative effect on the development of the player and the European system. He stated that of the 527 Czech Republic players who went to North American junior hockey, only 22 of them played more than 400 NHL games. He sought to establish a European system that was competitive enough to deter players from entering into the CHL Import Draft.

See also
2007 Super Series (Canada versus Russia challenge)
List of ice hockey leagues
Junior Hockey League (Russia)
World Junior A Challenge
World Junior Ice Hockey Championships
World Junior Club Cup

References

External links

Canadian Hockey League (CHL) official site
Canadian Junior Hockey League (CJHL) official site
USA Hockey: Junior Hockey
United Hockey Union